The 1938 Masters Tournament was the fifth Masters Tournament, held April 2–4 at Augusta National Golf Club in Augusta, Georgia. Due to adverse weather conditions, the first round was delayed until Saturday, rounds 2 and 3 were played on Sunday, and the final round was on Monday.

Henry Picard led by one stroke after 54 holes and shot 70 in the final round to win his only Masters, two strokes ahead of runners-up Harry Cooper and Ralph Guldahl. It was the first of two major titles for Picard, who won the PGA Championship in 1939.

The purse was $5,000 with a winner's share of $1,500. Ben Hogan made his Masters debut and finished tied for 25th. Tournament host Bobby Jones finished in the top twenty for the second and final time.

Field
1. Masters champions
Byron Nelson (7,9,10,12), Gene Sarazen (2,4,6,7,9,10), Horton Smith (7,9)

2. U.S. Open champions
Billy Burke (9,10), Ralph Guldahl (7,9,10), Bobby Jones (3,4,5,9), Willie Macfarlane (9), Tony Manero (7,9,12), Sam Parks Jr. (10)

3. U.S. Amateur champions
Lawson Little (5,9), Jess Sweetser (5,a)

4. British Open champions
Denny Shute (6,7,9,10,12)

5. British Amateur champions

6. PGA champions
Johnny Revolta (7,9,10), Paul Runyan (9,10)

7. Members of the U.S. 1937 Ryder Cup team
Ed Dudley (9,10), Henry Picard (10,12), Sam Snead (9,10)

8. Members of the U.S. 1938 Walker Cup team
Chuck Kocsis (10,a), Tommy Suffern Tailer (a), Bud Ward (11,a), Charlie Yates (9,a)

Ray Billows (11,a), Johnny Fischer (3,11,a), Johnny Goodman (2,3,5,10,11,a), Fred Haas (a) and Reynolds Smith (11,a) did not play. Tailer was a reserve for the team.

9. Top 30 players and ties from the 1937 Masters Tournament
Harry Cooper (10,12), Wiffy Cox, Bobby Cruickshank (10), Leonard Dodson, Vic Ghezzi (10), Jimmy Hines (10,12), Ky Laffoon (10,12), Ray Mangrum (10), Felix Serafin, Jimmy Thomson (10), Al Watrous, Craig Wood

Tommy Armour, Clarence Clark (10) and Al Espinosa did not play.

10. Top 30 players and ties from the 1937 U.S. Open
Leo Mallory, Jug McSpaden (12), Toney Penna, Frank Strafaci (a), Frank Walsh

Al Brosch, Jimmy Demaret, Fred Morrison, Pat Sawyer and Bob Stupple did not play.

11. 1937 U.S. Amateur quarter-finalists
Chick Evans (2,3,a) and Don Moe (a) did not play.

12. 1937 PGA Championship quarter-finalists

13. Two players, not already qualified, with the best scoring average in the winter part of the 1938 PGA Tour
Ben Hogan, Dick Metz

14 Foreign invitations
Stanley Horne, Ross Somerville (11,a)

Round summaries

First round
Saturday, April 2, 1938

Source:

Second round
Sunday, April 3, 1938   (morning)

Third round
Sunday, April 3, 1938   (afternoon)

Source:

Final round
Monday, April 4, 1938

Final leaderboard

Sources:

References

External links
Masters.com – past winners and results
Augusta.com – 1938 Masters leaderboard

1938
1938 in golf
1938 in American sports
1938 in sports in Georgia (U.S. state)
April 1938 sports events